Modular synthesizers are synthesizers composed of separate modules for different functions. The modules can be connected together by the user to create a patch. The outputs from the modules may include audio signals, analog control voltages, or digital signals for logic or timing conditions. Typical modules are voltage-controlled oscillators, voltage-controlled filters, voltage-controlled amplifiers and envelope generators.

History 
The first modular synthesizer was developed by German engineer Harald Bode in the late 1950s. The 1960s saw the introduction of the Moog synthesizer and the Buchla Modular Electronic Music System, created around the same period. The Moog was composed of separate modules which created and shaped sounds, such as envelopes, noise generators, filters, and sequencers, connected by patch cords.

The Japanese company Roland released the Roland System 100 in 1975, followed by the System 700 in 1976 and the System 100m in 1979.

In the late 1970s, modular synthesizers started to be largely supplanted in pop music by highly integrated keyboard synthesizers, racks of MIDI-connected gear, and samplers. By the 1990s, modular synthesizers had fallen out of favor compared to cheaper, smaller digital and software synthesizers. However, there continued to be a community who chose the physically patched approach, the flexibility and the sound of traditional modular systems.

Since the late 1990s,  there has been a resurgence in the popularity of analog synthesizers aided by physical standardization practices, an increase in available retro gear and interest, decreased production costs and increased electronic reliability and stability, the rediscovered ability of modules to control things other than sound, and a generally heightened education through the development of virtual synthesis systems such as VCV Rack, MAX/MSP, Pd and Reaktor etc.

Types of module 
The basic modular functions are: signal, control, logic/timing. Typically, inputs and outputs are an electric voltage.

The difference between a synthesizer module and a stand-alone effects unit is that an effects unit will have connections for input and output of the audio signal and knobs or switches for users to control various parameters of the device (for example, the modulation rate for a chorus effect) while a synthesizer module may have connections for input and output, but will also have connections so that the device's parameters can be further controlled by other modules (for example, to connect a low-frequency oscillator module to the modulation input of a delay module to get the chorus effect.)

There exist many different types of modules.  Modules with the same basic functions may have different inputs, outputs and controls, depending on their degree of complexity. Some examples include the voltage-controlled oscillator (VCO), which may have options for sync (hard or soft), linear or exponential frequency modulation, and variable waveshape; the voltage-controlled filter (VCF) that may have both resonance and bandwidth controls; and the envelope generator which may provide outputs at each stage of the process. Examples of more complex modules include the frequency shifter, sequencer, and vocoder.

Modular synthesizers may be bulky and expensive. There are some standards that manufacturers follow for their range of physical synthesizers, such as 1 V/octave control voltages, and gate and trigger thresholds providing general compatibility; however, connecting synthesizers from different manufacturers may require cables with different kinds of plugs.

German engineer Dieter Doepfer believed modular synthesizers could still be useful for creating unique sounds, and created a new, smaller modular system, the Doepfer A-100. This led to a new standard for modular systems, Eurorack; as of 2017, over 100 companies, including Moog and Roland, were developing Eurorack modules.

Typical modules 
Modules can usually be categorized as either sources or processors. Standard modules found in a modular synthesizer are:

Sources - characterized by an output, but no signal input; it may have control inputs:
 VCO – Voltage-controlled oscillator, outputs a signal whose frequency is a function of input control voltage and settings. In its basic form, these may be simple waveforms (most usually a square wave or a sawtooth wave, but also includes pulse, triangle and sine waves), however these can be dynamically changed through such controls as sync, frequency modulation, and self-modulation.
 Noise source - Common types of noise offered by modular synthesizers include white, pink, and low frequency noise.
 LFO -  A low-frequency oscillator may or may not be voltage-controlled. It may be operated with a period anywhere from a fortieth of a second to several minutes. It is generally used as a control voltage for another module. For example, modulating a VCO will produce a frequency modulation perceived as vibrato, while modulating a VCA will produce amplitude modulation perceived as tremolo, depending on the control frequency. A rectangular wave output from a LFO can be used as a logic output for timing or trigger functions on other modules.
 EG - An envelope generator is a transient voltage source. A trigger control signal applied to an envelope generator produces a single, shaped voltage. Often configured as ADSR (attack, decay, sustain, release) it provides a control voltage that rises and falls. Usually it controls the amplitude of a VCA or the cutoff frequency of a VCF, but the patchable structure of the synthesizer makes it possible to use the envelope generator to modulate other parameters such as the frequency or pulse width of the VCO. Simpler EGs (AD or AR) or more complex (DADSR—delay, attack, decay, sustain, release) are sometimes available.
 Sequencer or analog sequencer, is a family of compound module types that may be a source or a processor. As a source, depending upon the configuration, it may produce a sequence of voltages, usually set by adjusting values on front panel knobs. The sequencer may also output a trigger, or gate, at each step. Sequencers are stepped by a trigger being applied to the trigger input. Designs may allow for stepping forwards or backwards, oscillating patterns, random order, or only using a limited number of steps. An example of an analog sequencer and controller with this level of complexity is the Doepfer A-154, A-155 combination.

Processors - characterized by a signal input and an output and may have control inputs:
 VCF - Voltage-controlled filter, which attenuates frequencies below (high-pass), above (low-pass) or both below and above (band-pass) a certain frequency. Most VCFs have variable resonance, sometimes voltage-controlled.
 VCA - Voltage-controlled amplifier, varies the amplitude of a signal in response to an applied control voltage. The response curve may be linear or exponential. Also called a two-quadrant multiplier.
 LPG - Low-pass gate, is a compound module, similar to a VCA combined with a VCF. The circuit uses a resistive opto-isolator to respond to the control voltage, which also filters the sound, allowing more high-frequency information through at higher amplification.
 RM - Ring modulator - Two audio inputs are utilized to create sum and difference frequencies while suppressing the original signals. Also called an analog multiplier or frequency mixer.
 Mixer - A module that adds voltages.
 Multiple - Fan out a voltage output to multiple inputs.
 Slew limiter - A sub-audio low-pass filter. When used in a control voltage path to an oscillator, produces a portamento effect.
 S&H - Sample and hold, is usually used as a control-voltage processor. Depending upon the design, usually an ascending edge (trigger), captures the value of the voltage at the input, and outputs this voltage until the trigger input reads another voltage and repeats the process.
 Sequencer, (see also above), as a processor, may have a signal input into each step, (location or stage), which is output, when stepped to. An example of this type of sequencer is the Doepfer A-155.
 Custom control inputs - It is possible to connect any kind of voltage to a modular synthesizer as long as it remains in the usable voltage range of the instrument, usually -15V to +15V.

Modern manufacturers of modular hardware synthesizers (alphabetical)

Hardware offerings range from complete systems in cases to kits for hobbyists. Many manufacturers augment their range with products based on recent re-designs of classic modules; often both the original and subsequent reworked designs are available free on the Internet, the original patents having lapsed. Many hobbyist designers also make available bare PCB boards and front panels for sale to other hobbyists.

 Buchla Electronic Musical Instruments (formerly Buchla & Associates)
 Doepfer Musikelektronik (A-100)
 Moog Music (formerly Big Briar, formerly Moog)
 Synthesis Technology
 PAiA Electronics
 Analogue Systems
 Sound Transform Systems
 Studio Electronics
 Synthesizers.com
 Synton Fenix

Technical specifications

Form factors
Many early synthesizer modules had height in integer inches: 11" (e.g., Roland 700), 10" (e.g.,  Wavemakers), 9" (e.g., Aries), 8" (e.g., ARP 2500), 7" (e.g., Polyfusion, Buchla, Serge), 6" (e.g., Emu) and width in 1/4" inch multiples. More recently it has become more popular to follow the standard 19" rack unit system: 6U (Wiard), 5U (8.75" e.g., Moog/Modcan), 4U (e.g., Serge), 3U (Eurorack).

Two 3U unit standards, in particular, are notable: Frac Rack (e.g., PAiA), which uses the entire 3U for the front panel, and Eurorack (e.g., Doepfer) which has a 2 mm horizontal lip that the front panels are seated between. Further minor variations exist where European or Japanese manufacturers round a U measurement up or down to some closer convenient metric equivalent; for example, the common 5U modules are exactly , but non-American manufacturers may prefer 220 or 230 mm.

Electrical 
Other differences are in the plugs used, which can match 1/4-inch (6.3 mm) or 3.5 mm phone connectors, banana jacks, or breadboard patch leads; in the main power supply, which is most often ±12 V or ±15 V, but can range from 2.5±2.5 V to 0±18 V for different manufacturers or systems; in the trigger or gate voltages (Moog S-trigger or positive gate), with typical audio signal levels (often ±5 V with ±5 V headroom); and with control voltages of volts/octave, typically 1 V/octave, but in some cases 1.2 V/octave.

In most analog modular systems the frequency is exponentially related to the control voltage (such as 1 volt/octave or 1.2 volts/octave), sometimes called linear because the human ear perceives frequencies in a logarithmic fashion, with each octave having the same perceptual size. Some synthesizers (such as Korg MS-20, ETI 4600) use a system where the frequency (but not the perceived pitch) is linear with voltage.

Due to the continuously variable nature of knobs and sliders, reproducing an exact patch can be difficult.

Modular software synthesizers (alphabetical)
There are also software synthesizers for personal computers which are organized as interconnectable modules. Many of these are virtual analog synthesizers, where the modules simulate hardware functionality. Some of them are also virtual modular systems, which simulate real historical modular synthesizers.

 AudioMulch
 Arturia Modular V
 Bidule
 Bitwig Studio (The Grid)
 ChucK
 CreamwareAudio Modular III
 Csound
 Doepfer
 MaxMSP
 Moog Model 15
 Kyma
 Pure Data
 Reaktor
 SunVox
 SuperCollider
 VCV Rack
 Wren for Windows (open-source)

Computers have grown so powerful and inexpensive that software programs can realistically model the signals, sounds, and patchability of modular synthesizers very well. While potentially lacking the physical presence of desirable analog sound generation, real voltage manipulation, knobs, sliders, cables, and LEDs, software modular synthesizers offer the infinite variations and visual patching at a more affordable price and in a compact form factor.

The popular plugin formats such as VST may be combined in a modular fashion.

Semi-modular synthesizers

A modular synthesizer has a case or frame into which arbitrary modules can be fitted; modules are usually connected together using patch cords and a system may include modules from different sources, as long as it fits the form factors of the case and uses the same electrical specifications.

A semi-modular synthesizer on the other hand is a collection of modules from a single manufacturer that makes a cohesive product, an instrument. Modules may not be swapped out and usually a typical configuration has been pre-wired. The “modules” are typically not separable and may physically be parts of a contiguous circuit board. However, the manufacturer provides mechanisms to allow the user to connect modules in different orders and often to connect external components or modules (chosen and supplied by the user) between those of the instrument.

Matrix systems 

Matrix systems use pin matrices or other crosspoint switches rather than patch cords.
The ARP 2500 was the first synthesizer to use a fixed switch matrix.
The pin matrix was made popular in the EMS VCS-3 and its descendants like the EMS Synthi 100. Other systems include the ETI 4600, and the Maplin 5600s.

In digital times the clean logical layout of these matrices has inspired a number of manufacturers like Arturia to include digitally programmable matrices in their analog or virtual analog synthesizers.
Many fully digital synthesizers, like the Alesis Ion, make use of the logic and nomenclature of a "modulation matrix", even when the graphical layout of a hardware matrix is completely absent.

Patch override systems
The different modules of a semi-modular synthesizer are wired together into a typical configuration, but can be re-wired by the user using patch cords. Some examples are the ARP 2600, Anyware Semtex, Cwejman S1, EML101, Evenfall Minimodular, Future Retro XS, Korg MS-10 / MS-20 / PS-3100 / PS-3200 / PS-3300, Mungo State Zero, Roland System 100, Korg Volca Modular and Moog Mother-32 .

Electronically reconfigurable systems
Reconfigurable systems allow certain signals to be routed through modules in different orders. Examples include the Oberheim Matrix and Rhodes Chroma, and Moog Voyager.

Hybrid modular synthesizers
Hybrid synthesizers use hardware and software combination. In alphabetical order:
 Arturia Origin by Arturia (fully self-contained)
 Clavia Nord Modular and Clavia Nord Modular G2 (these need an external computer to edit patches)
 Audiocubes

See also
 Chiptune
 Circuit bending
 Software synthesizer
 Sound module
 Synthesizer
 Switched-On Bach

Notes

References

External links
 120 years of Electronic Music has information on classic modular synths.
 Synthmuseum.com Resource for vintage synthesizer information and images.
 Modular Analog Synthesizers Return! Article about new modular systems.
 Modular Music TV Website dedicated to tutorials, news, performances and more using modular systems.
 Generalized Introduction to Modular Analog Synthesis Concepts Article on modular analog synthesis concepts
 ModularSynth.co Network of modular synth manufacturers and producers.

 Mechanical specifications
 Modular Synthesizer Comparison Chart
 Modular Form Factors
 DotCom Moog 5U
 Synthesis MOTM 5U
 PAiA FracRak 3U
 Doepfer Eurorack 3U
 Intellijel 1U
 Pulp Logic "1u" Tiles

Modular synthesizers